Thymiatris scolia is a moth in the family Xyloryctidae. It was described by Alexey Diakonoff in 1966. It is found on Java.

References

Thymiatris
Moths described in 1966